The legislative districts of Romblon are the representations of the province of Romblon in the various national legislatures of the Philippines. The province is currently represented in the lower house of the Congress of the Philippines through its lone congressional district.

History 

Romblon, then part of the province of Capiz, initially had two delegates, appointed at-large, to the Malolos Congress in 1898; this remained so until 1899. Romblon was represented as part of the third district of Capiz from 1907 to 1919. It was later reestablished as a separate province in 1917, thus its separate representation was restored, electing one representative this time in 1919.

Romblon was represented in the Interim Batasang Pambansa as part of Region IV-A from 1978 to 1984, and returned one representative, elected at large, to the Regular Batasang Pambansa in 1984.

Current districts

References 

Romblon
Politics of Romblon